Ulanbek Moldodosov (born June 18, 1976) is a Kyrgyzstani weightlifter. Moldodosov competed at the 2004 Summer Olympics in Athens, where he placed eleventh in the men's light heavyweight category (85 kg), with a total weight of 342.5 kg.

At the 2008 Summer Olympics in Beijing, Moldodosov competed for the second time in the men's 85 kg class. He repeated his eleventh-place position in this event, as he successfully lifted 152 kg in the single-motion snatch, and hoisted 194 kg in the two-part, shoulder-to-overhead clean and jerk, for a total of 347 kg.

Major results

References

External links
 
NBC 2008 Olympics profile

Kyrgyzstani male weightlifters
1976 births
Living people
Sportspeople from Bishkek
Olympic weightlifters of Kyrgyzstan
Weightlifters at the 2004 Summer Olympics
Weightlifters at the 2008 Summer Olympics
Weightlifters at the 2002 Asian Games
Weightlifters at the 2006 Asian Games
Asian Games competitors for Kyrgyzstan
Islamic Solidarity Games medalists in weightlifting
20th-century Kyrgyzstani people
21st-century Kyrgyzstani people